Errors of the Human Body is a 2012 psychological thriller directed by Eron Sheean and starring Michael Eklund.

Plot
Dr. Geoff Burton (Eklund), a brilliant genetics researcher, is invited to a lab in Dresden, only to discover a lethal virus is being created, which he may have unintentionally caused and be its first victim. This mystery is set against Dr. Burton trying to find redemption and peace from a past haunted by the death of his infant son.

Cast

Background
While showing a short film at Berlinale in 2006, Sheean met a scientist from the Max Planck Institute of Molecular Cell Biology and Genetics, the brother of cinematographer Anna Howard, who became director of photography on the film. He developed the feature while serving as an artist in residency for over six years at the institute in Dresden. Sheean said in an interview, "I managed to convince them to let me develop a feature film based around the institute and some of their bizarre and fascinating research projects. It’s not a documentary – it’s a fiction film with some real science as the jumping-off point for the story."

Release and reception
After having its world premiere at Fantasia Festival in Montreal in July 2012, the film had its U.S. premiere in September at Fantastic Fest in Austin. It was also selected at the Melbourne International Film Festival, International Film Festival Rotterdam, Miami International Film Festival, International Film Festival Phoenix,  Frightfest London, Transatlantyk - Poznań International Film and Music Festival, Telluride Horror Show and  Rio de Janeiro International Film Festival. In September 2012, Jeff Deutchman from Sundance Selects/IFC negotiated with Nate Bolotin at XYZ Films for the North American rights to distribute the film.

During its tour of the festival circuit the film received mostly positive reviews, especially around Eklund's performance. Gabriel Ruzin of Screen Invasion wrote, "Errors of the Human Body is elevated by a sublime turn by star Michael Eklund... His agony, particularly in the third act, is brilliantly painful. Despite the screenplay skimming over his character’s supposed scientific prowess, to the film’s moderate detriment, Eklund’s powerful performance is nonetheless tragic and captivating." Michael Treveloni of Film School Rejects noted, "The film is a not just a science-fiction horror story: it is a commentary on the importance of dialog, showcasing the need for communication in its many forms. With Geoff, Errors presents the perfect, damaged subject.". At the Fantastic Fest screening, Sheean himself said, "The film is about a breakdown in communication, both on the surface in the characters and internally with the cells."

Awards
 Fantastic Fest Next Wave Spotlight Competition – Michael Eklund for Best Actor
 LEO Awards 2013 - Best Lead Performance by a Male in a Feature Length Drama: Michael Eklund
 Trieste Science+Fiction Festival – Asteroid Award Best Film

References

External links

2012 films
Films shot in Germany
Films about genetic engineering
Films about scientists
American psychological thriller films
English-language German films
German psychological thriller films
2010s English-language films
2010s American films
2010s German films